Reginald Bolton (20 November 1909 – 21 September 2006) was an English physician and England International rugby player.

He played five times for England making his debut against Wales in 1933. His final appearance was in 1938.

He played for Wakefield and Harlequins, as well as thirty times for Yorkshire.

He was son of Professor J Shaw Bolton, the medical Superintendent at the west Riding Mental Hospital in Wakefield and a pupil at QEGS Wakefield.

References 

20th-century English medical doctors
English rugby union players
Wakefield RFC players
People educated at Queen Elizabeth Grammar School, Wakefield
England international rugby union players
2006 deaths
1909 births
Yorkshire County RFU players
Rugby union players from Gloucestershire